In anatomy, a canaliculus is a small passageway.

Examples include:
 Two functionally different structures in bone:
 Bone canaliculus, a small channel found in ossified bone for nutrition for example in the Haversian canal
 A small canal (anatomy) in bone which carries some structure (such as a nerve) through it
 Canaliculus (parietal cell), an adaptation found on gastric parietal cells
 The lacrimal canaliculi, several small ducts in the eye
 The dental canaliculi, the blood supply within a tooth
 Bile canaliculi, where the bile produced by the hepatocytes is drained 
 Inferior tympanic canaliculus, the passage for the tympanic branch of the glossopharyngeal nerve and inferior tympanic artery
 Foramen petrosum (canaliculus innominatus), a small occasional opening in the greater wing of the sphenoid bone